This is a list of urban areas in the California as defined by the U.S. Census Bureau, ordered according to their 2010 estimated Census populations. In the table, UA refers to "urbanized area" (urban areas with population over 50,000) and UC refers to "urban cluster" (urban areas with population less than 50,000). The list includes urban areas with a population of at least 10,000. Rows in green indicate that part of the area lies outside of California. Rows without a rank indicate that the center of the area is outside of California.

References

External links

 U.S. Census Bureau Los Angeles-Long Beach-Santa Ana UA data profile
 U.S. Census Bureau San Francisco-Oakland UA data profile
 U.S. Census Bureau San Diego UA data profile

 
Regions of California
Urban areas